Power Supply is Budgie's eighth studio album, released in October 1980 on Active Records, a sublabel of RCA Records (which was the distributor of A&M Records — Budgie's previous label — at the time). This is the first album without original guitarist Tony Bourge, who left the band in 1978 after the album Impeckable.

Track listing

These tracks were originally released as the If Swallowed Do Not Induce Vomiting EP.

Personnel
Band members
Burke Shelley – vocals, bass
John Thomas – guitar, slide guitar
Steve Williams – drums

Production
Dave Charles – producer, engineer
Neil Jones – light & sound design
Tommy John – light & sound design
Eric Olthwaite – light & sound design
Adrian Chesterman – Illustration

References

Budgie (band) albums
1980 albums
New Wave of British Heavy Metal albums
RCA Records albums